Paul Charles Delheid (9 December 1909 – 6 July 1987 at Opprebais, Walloon Brabant, Belgium) was a Belgian field hockey player who competed in the 1928 Summer Olympics and in the 1936 Summer Olympics.

He was a member of the Belgian field hockey team which finished fourth in the 1928 Olympic tournament. He played all five matches as forward and scored one goal.

Eight years later he was part of the Belgian team which was eliminated in the first round of the 1936 Olympic tournament. He played all three matches.

External links
 
profile

1909 births
Year of death missing
Belgian male field hockey players
Olympic field hockey players of Belgium
Field hockey players at the 1928 Summer Olympics
Field hockey players at the 1936 Summer Olympics